Striacosta is a genus of insect, belonging to the family Noctuidae. It contains only one species, Striacosta albicosta, which is found in North America.

References

Monotypic moth genera
Moths of North America